Ernest Kombo (March 27, 1941 – October 22, 2008) was a Congo-Brazzaville religious official born in 1941 in Pointe-Noire, French Equatorial Africa. He was ordained a Catholic priest for the Society of Jesus (S.J.) on July 6, 1973. On December 5, 1983, he was appointed the third bishop of the Roman Catholic Diocese of Nkayi and he was consecrated bishop on January 6, 1984 by Pope John Paul II assisted by Cardinals Eduardo Martínez Somalo and Duraisamy Simon Lourdusamy, inside St. Peter's Basilica. Following the appointment of Msgr. Georges-Firmin Singha as Bishop of Pointe-Noire, Bishop Kombo was transferred to the Diocese of Owando on July 7, 1990 as the second bishop of that diocese from the Republic of the Congo. He was very direct in his manner.
 
From 1991 to 1992, he was elected to head Congo's interim legislature, the Conseil Superieur de la Republique (CRS). In October 1994, at the General Assembly of the Synod of Bishops, at the Vatican, Bishop Kombo proposed that some Roman Catholic nuns be made members of the College of Cardinals, because of their mission to the Roman Catholic Church.
Msgr. Kombo died in Paris, France, at the Val-de-Grâce Hospital of stomach cancer, on Wednesday, October 22, 2008, aged 67, where he was recovering from his poor health. According to his will, his body was repatriated to his native Congo for interment inside the small Catholic Cemetery adjoining the Metropolitan Cathedral Sacre-Coeur of Brazzaville.

Notes

1941 births
2008 deaths
Presidents of the National Assembly (Republic of the Congo)
Republic of the Congo Jesuits
20th-century Roman Catholic bishops in the Republic of the Congo
21st-century Roman Catholic bishops in the Republic of the Congo
Jesuit bishops
Roman Catholic bishops of Owando
Roman Catholic bishops of Nkayi
Republic of the Congo Roman Catholic bishops